Jamtara – Sabka Number Ayega is an Indian crime drama web television series created & directed by Soumendra Padhi and written by Trishant Srivastava. The story revolves around the social engineering operations in the Jamtara district of Jharkhand. It was released on Netflix on 10 January 2020. The second season premiered on 23 September 2022.

Cast 
 Amit Sial as Brajesh Bhaan
 Dibyendu Bhattacharya as Inspector Biswa Paathak
 Aksha Pardasany as SP Dolly Sahu
 Sparsh Shrivastav as Sunny
 Anshumaan Pushkar as Rocky
 Aasif Khan as Anas Ahmad
 Monika Panwar as Gudiya Singh
Harshit Gupta as Baccha
 Rohit KP as Munna
 Aatm Prakash Mishra as Bachchu
 Kartavya Kabra as Shahbaaz
 Monu Kanojiya as Chhotu
 Simran Mishrikoti as Varsha Mishra
 Mahesh Chandra Deva as Doctor

Plot 
The story revolves a bunch of small-town young guns who operate a successful phishing racket, but then they come across a corrupt politician who wants a share of their business. Finally there's a newly appointed Police superintendent who wants to fight against them all.

Seasons and Episodes

Production 
In 2015, Padhi read an article about the phishing operations carried out by school children in Jamtara district which sparked his interest. He sent his writing team to do research. The character of female SP Dolly Sahu was based on Jamtara's Superintendent Jaya Roy.

Reception 
Kirubhakar Purushothaman of The New Indian Express said that the plot of the series is "tightly-written and disseminates information seamlessly, hooking us from the word go." Udita Jhunjunwala of Scroll.in called it "extremely binge-able" and wrote: "The characterisation and dynamics of Jamtara land somewhere in the realm of the Anurag Kashyap meets Tigmanshu Dhulia universe."

Tanisha Bagchi of The Quint wrote: "Had the narrative been more layered, Jamtara would have been a huge feather in the cap for Netflix, which has churned out disappointing originals such as Chopsticks, Drive, Ghost Stories, etc." Rohan Nahar of Hindustan Times gave a positive review and said that the "underdog series washes away the stench of recent big-budget failures" for Netflix.

References

External links

2020 Indian television series debuts
Hindi-language Netflix original programming
Indian crime drama television series
Indian crime television series
Indian television series distributed by Netflix
Television shows set in Jharkhand